ESPN Deportes La Revista is a Spanish language magazine that focuses on sports from an Hispanic perspective. La Revista translates to "the Magazine", and ESPN Deportes (which means ESPN Sports) is the name of a Spanish-language sports channel. Just as ESPN Deportes is meant as the Spanish language of ESPN, ESPN Deportes la Revista is meant as the Spanish language equivalent of ESPN The Magazine, although it produces original content and covers events throughout the world. 

ESPN Deportes La Revista was first published in August 2005. The magazine is published by GW Publishing US LLC with offices in Miami, Florida, Puerto Rico and Mexico City. 

Federico Flores Navarro is the CEO, Andoni Biurrarena is the editorial director, Jaime Olive is publisher (Mexico), Evaristo Lara is editor-in-chief, Betsie Batista is the advertising sales director, Brenda M. Tabraue-Perez is the circulation and consumer marketing manager, Juan David Cabassa is the Puerto Rico sales representative, José del Valle is staff writer, Mario Chavez Garcia is copy editor, art manager is Rodrigo Galindo, staff photographer is Tom DiPace, Photography director is David Panagua and Alberto Serralde is lead designer.

References

External links
 Official Website (in Spanish)

Sports magazines published in the United States
Deportes La Revista
Magazines established in 2005
Spanish-language magazines
Magazines published in Florida
Spanish-language mass media in Florida
2005 establishments in Florida